Mountain View Farm may refer to:

 Mountain View Farm (Plainview, Arkansas), listed on the National Register of Historic Places (NRHP) in Arkansas
 Mountain View Farm (Dublin, New Hampshire), listed on the NRHP in Cheshire County, New Hampshire
Mountain View Stock Farm, Benson, Vermont, listed on the National Register of Historic Places in Rutland County, Vermont
 Mountain View Farm (Clifford, Virginia), listed on the NRHP in Amherst County, Virginia
 Mountain View Farm (Lexington, Virginia), listed on the NRHP in Rockbridge County, Virginia